Monta McGhee (born November 11, 1979) is an American former professional basketball player. McGhee has played for several teams in Europe after his time with the Lewis Flyers in the NCAA2 competition.

Honours

Club
ZZ Leiden
Dutch Basketball League (1): 2010–11
NBB Cup (1): 2009–10

Individual
ZZ Leiden
DBL All-Star (1): 2010

References

External links
Eurobasket.com profile
FIBA Profile

1979 births
Living people
American expatriate basketball people in Belgium
American expatriate basketball people in Denmark
American expatriate basketball people in Germany
American expatriate basketball people in Israel
American expatriate basketball people in the Netherlands
American men's basketball players
B.S. Leiden players
Basketball players from Dallas
Cuxhaven BasCats players
Dutch Basketball League players
Giants Nördlingen players
Horsens IC players
Junior college men's basketball players in the United States
Kishwaukee College alumni
Leuven Bears players
Lewis Flyers men's basketball players
Small forwards